JS Michishio (SS-591) is the second boat of the s. She was commissioned on 10 March 1999.

Construction and career
Michishio was laid down at Mitsubishi Heavy Industries Kobe Shipyard on 16 February 1995 and launched on 18 September 1997. She was commissioned on 10 March 1999 and deployed to Kure.

The vessel participated in RIMPAC 2007 from 9 January to 11 April 2007.

On 27 February 2017, due to the removal of the training submarine , the designation of Michishio was changed to a training submarine and it was incorporated into the 1st training submarine under the direct control of the submarine fleet. From 18 March to 1 May 2017, the 2016 open sea practice voyage (flight) was carried out with the escort ship  and the two vessels called at Kota Kinabalu, Malaysia.

On 18 June 2020, Lieutenant Risa Takenouchi was the first woman in Japanese service to be appointed to the crew of a submarine. Takenouchi who entered the "submarine education and training corps" for the first time in January, was educated for about five months. After completing the course, she joined the training unit Michishio and started training on a submarine. On 29 October 2020, the first female submarine crew was created. Five female SDF personnel, including Yumeka Taguchi, a third-class sea sergeant, joined the submarine education and training corps in February 2020, and after undergoing a curriculum, conducted practical training on the ship from June for about four months. After completing the training, they were awarded the emblem (commonly known as the "Dolphin Mark"), which is a proof of the crew of the submarine.

Gallery

Citations

External links

1997 ships
Oyashio-class submarines
Ships built by Mitsubishi Heavy Industries
Training ships of the Japan Maritime Self-Defense Force